Panchanada Sabanayagam (born 7 June 1922) is a retired Indian Administrative Service officer and a former Chief Secretary of Tamil Nadu.

Early life and military service
Sabanayagam was born in Madras (now Chennai) to S. Panchanada Mudaliar, a lawyer. After taking an honours degree from Madras Christian College in 1942 and leaving with the college's Ross Prize, he considered graduate studies, but instead applied for a commission in the British Indian Army and was selected. He completed basic training at the Officers' Training School, Mhow, and was then sent to Deolali Artillery School for a six-month course. On 25 June 1944, he received an emergency commission as a second lieutenant in the 10th Field Regiment of Indian Artillery, posted at Chhindwara. Impressing his commanding officer Colonel Gurney with his efficiency, Sabanayagam was promoted war-substantive lieutenant on 25 December 1944 and received further promotion to captain in October 1945 over eight more senior lieutenants, six of whom were British. He was subsequently selected for a regular commission and a posting to the United Kingdom to attend the Long Gunnery Staff Course. As his father wished him to join the civil service, he declined the offer and relinquished his commission.

Civil servant
The Indian government experienced shortages of qualified officers during the transitional period before and immediately after independence. As a consequence, Sabanayagam was appointed to the new Indian Administrative Service as a War Service Candidate on 20 March 1947, in the 1945 batch of officers. In the wake of Independence and partition on 15 August, his training was suspended while he and his fellow junior civil servants were dispatched to manage the resulting refugee crisis. He was then assigned to the Madras cadre and sent to the state in December 1947 to undergo training in district administration.

Sabanayagam served in various capacities under the Chief Ministers of Tamil Nadu until his retirement in 1980, his most notable position being that of Chief Secretary from 1971 to 1976. He turned 100 in June 2022, a milestone that was congratulated and praised by Chief Minister M. K. Stalin.

References

1922 births
Living people
Indian Administrative Service officers
British Indian Army officers
Military personnel from Chennai
Indian military personnel of World War II
Indian centenarians
Men centenarians